Xuxa só para Baixinhos 12 or É Para Dançar (also known as XSPB 12) is the thirty-fifth studio album and the twenty-eighth in Portuguese of Brazilian singer and TV host Xuxa Meneghel, released by Sony Music on June 29, 2013, is the twelfth album in the collection Só Para Baixinhos.

Release and reception
Xuxa só para Baixinhos 12 - É Para Dançar, was released on June 29, 2013. It was released in the formats DVD, DVD and CD and Blu-ray, this was the second album of the collection Só Para Baixinhos not to have the physical version in CD, DVD versions and DVD and CD were released in Digipak format. This was the fourth and last album in the collection Só Para Baixinhos, released by Sony Music, after Xuxa renewed his contract with the record company Som Livre, which released the first eight volumes. It is the XSPB with more controversies in production. The project for the album would be for 2012, but a few weeks later it was announced that the album would not be released in 2012, and that it would be released in April 2013 but suffered another delay and was released in late June 2013.

XSPB 12 sold in three months 50,000 copies, getting certified platinum.

Awards
É Pra Dançar was nominated for the Best Latin Children's Album in 15th Annual Latin Grammy Awards in 2014.

Track listing

Personnel

General and Artistic Direction: Xuxa Meneghel
Direction: Paulo de Barros
Production: Luiz Cláudio Moreira and Mônica Muniz
Production Director: Junior Porto 
Musical production: Guto Graça Melo
Musical Coordination: Vanessa Alves
Cinematography: André Horta
Set design: Lueli Antunes and Leila Chaves
Art Production: Flávia Cristofaro
Choreography Direction: Wagner Menezes (Fly)
Costume: Marcelo Cavalcanti
Make up: Fábio Morgado
Edition: Paulo de Barros and Rodrigo Mantega
Finishing: Bernardo Varela
Concept Design and Animation: Rodrigo Mantega
Post Production Coordination: Helo Lopes
Menu and Extras: Vinícius Santana Pinto  
Sound Design: Pedro Sarmento
Authorization and Programming: Junior Laks
Orthographic Review: Tainá Diniz and Rita Godoy
Subtitles and 3D Animation: Luís Cláudio Barbosa  
Text Editing: Alexandre Pereira, Fausto Villanova and Fábio Pontual 
Image Editing: Rodrigo Magalhães, Ricardo Mello, Evandro Fraga and José Adelson Abreu
Audio Editing: Breno Muniz, Vanildo Barreto, David Diniz, Givaldo Severo and Marcelo Roldão 
Sound engineer: Marcos Carvalho
Sound technician: Octávio Luiz Lobo
Video Operator: Sandro Gama
Audio Operator: João Henrique Medeiros
Microphone Operator: Cláudio Cerdeira  
Electrician: Rogério Kennedy ''Fuca''
Lighting Assistants: Dimas de Souza, Luciano de Andrade, Vicente Gomes dos Santos, Mário Rinaldi and Luís Alberto 
Set design: Leila Araújo e Valéria Violeta
Scenography Assistant: Paulo Flaksman 
Hair: Márcia Elias
Seamstress: Ana Lúcia Costa
Description: Tinácio and Sérgia Maria Lima 
Make up: Luciene Araújo 
Choreography: Wagner Meneses (Fly)
Adapting Choreographies: Cathia Delmaschio 
Choreography Assistants: Ana Cecília Calderón and Fabrilla Cruz 
Press office: Tatiana Maranhão
Security chief: Magno Jesus
Property security: Demilson de Oliveira and Maurício Ferreira
Seguranças: Vítor Lopes and Márcio Avelino
Fire brigade: Amilton dos Santos
Nurse: Cíntia Rosa
Cleaning assistant: Lourdes Fontoura
Overall coordination: Andréa Lisboa 
Customer Service - Mega Studios: Ariadne Mazzetti, Patrícia Trad and Rita Vilhena 
Commercial assistant: Cris Moraes 
Effects Coordinator: Robson Sartori 
Colorist: Gerson Silva
Assistant of Telecine: Rodrigo Mantega
Mixing and Mastering: Lulu Farah
Final Cut Pro: Lillian Stock Bonzi
Composition and Effects: Rodrigo Kioshi, Gabriel Tinoco, Júnior Fernandes and Alex Barreiro
Online Edition: Francinaldo Lemos, Douglas Terciano, Valdo Caetano, Carlos Baptista and Eugen Pfister 
Graphic project: Tiago Martins e Felipe Gois  
Review: Marcos Lima 
Final art: Dani Dias 
Graphic Supervision: Gustavo Velasco 
Graphic Coordination: Marciso (Pena) Carvalho

Certifications

References

External links 
 Xuxa só para Baixinhos 12 at Discogs

2012 albums
2012 video albums
Xuxa video albums
Xuxa albums
Children's music albums by Brazilian artists
Portuguese-language video albums
Portuguese-language albums
Sony Music albums